El Diablo Rides is a 1939 American Western film directed by Ira S. Webb and written by Carl Krusada. The film stars Bob Steele, Claire Rochelle, Kit Guard, Carleton Young, Ted Adams and Robert Walker. The film was released on December 12, 1939, by Metropolitan Pictures Corporation.

Plot
Bob rides into a border town where he runs into trouble with Lambert and his gang. Herb arrests him claiming he is the outlaw El Diablo. But it was just to save him from Lambert's gang and the two now plan to trap the outlaws.

Cast           
Bob Steele as Bob
Claire Rochelle as Mary
Kit Guard as Dan 
Carleton Young as Herb Crenshaw
Ted Adams as Buck Lambert
Robert Walker as Frank
Robert Robinson as Sheriff 
Hal Carey as Saloon Singer

References

External links
 

1939 films
American Western (genre) films
1939 Western (genre) films
American black-and-white films
1930s English-language films
1930s American films